Howy is a name. Notable people with this name include:

 Godfrey George Howy Irving (1867–1937), Australian army officer
 Howy Parkins, American animation director
 Martin Howy Irving (1831–1912), English rower and educationist
 Sybil Howy Irving (1897–1973), Australian army officer